Jupp Ripfel (born 2 September 1938) is a former Swedish cyclist. He competed in the 1000m time trial at the 1968 Summer Olympics.

References

1938 births
Living people
Swedish male cyclists
Olympic cyclists of Sweden
Cyclists at the 1968 Summer Olympics